Nottingham Eastcroft is a light maintenance depot located in Nottingham, Nottinghamshire, England. The carriage sidings are located near Nottingham station and are situated alongside the former Midland Railway line to Lincoln.

The depot code is NM.

Present 
As of 2021, East Midlands Railway / Sprinters,  Express Sprinters and  Turbostars are allocated and maintained here. The depot is receiving a £2 million upgrade, increasing the capacity and modernising the fuelling facilities. This work is planned to be completed in June 2022.

Also present at Eastcroft is Boden Rail who maintain Class 37, Class 56 and Class 70 locomotives for Colas Rail.

References 

Rail transport in Nottinghamshire 
Railway depots in England